The 1950 Ohio gubernatorial election was held on November 7, 1950. Incumbent Democrat Frank Lausche defeated Republican nominee Don H. Ebright with 52.62% of the vote.

Primary elections
Primary elections were held on May 2, 1950.

Democratic primary

Candidates
Frank Lausche, incumbent Governor
Clarence H. Knisley, former Ohio State Treasurer
Joseph Torok Jr.

Results

Republican primary

Candidates
Don H. Ebright, Ohio State Treasurer
Jim Rhodes, Mayor of Columbus
Edward J. Hummel, former Ohio Secretary of State
George V. Woodling

Results

General election

Candidates
Frank Lausche, Democratic
Don H. Ebright, Republican

Results

References

1950
Ohio
Gubernatorial